Arthur Beethoven Danks (5 September 1891 – 25 December 1964) was an Australian rules footballer who played for the Richmond Football Club in the Victorian Football League (VFL). Danks served in the Australian Imperial Force between 12 August 1915 and 4 August 1919.

Notes

External links 
		

1891 births
1964 deaths
Australian rules footballers from Melbourne
Richmond Football Club players
People from Port Melbourne
Australian military personnel of World War I
Military personnel from Melbourne